Jennifer Ann Nielsen (born September 5, 1974) is an American retired soccer midfielder and former member of the United States women's national soccer team. In 2012, she was nominated for entry into the National Soccer Hall of Fame.

Life
Born in Chula Vista, California, Lalor attended Bonita Vista High School and helped the soccer team to two undefeated seasons and clinch two Metro League titles. She opted not to play high school soccer during her junior and senior years and instead played for the Southern California Blues club team.

Santa Clara University
Lalor attended Santa Clara University, where she played for the Broncos from 1992-1996. In 1994, she led the team in assists with 20. She was named to the NSCAA All-American team in 1993, 1994 and 1996. Lalor played in two Final Fours with the Broncos and led the nation in assists in 1994 and 1996. She was a finalist for the Missouri Athletic Club Award and Hermann Trophy in 1993 and 1994.

Lalor was the first player to ever receive a full scholarship for soccer to Santa Clara. She was inducted into the Santa Clara Hall of Fame in 2008.

Playing career

Club
From 1997–1998, Lalor played professionally in Japan for Shiroka Serena. In 1998, she played in Denmark for FB. In 1999, she played for Swedish club, Hammarby.

WUSA
Lalor was selected in the second round of the WUSA Inaugural Draft by the New York Power. She played for the Power from 2001–2002.  In 2003, she played for the San Diego Spirit.

International
Lalor was a member of the United States women's national soccer team player pool from 1987–1995. Her first appearance for the senior team occurred on August 18, 1992 in a match against Norway. She scored her first goal on August 13, 1994 during a match against Mexico. She previously represented the United States on the U-16, U-19, U-20 levels. From 1987-1991, she played for the U.S. Under-16 and Under-19 National Team. In 1993, she competed with the U-20 National team in France, when the team won the International Women's Tournament.

In 1995, she was part of the team that took home bronze at the Women's World Cup in Sweden.  She returned to the national team player pool in 2001.

Coaching career
On February 15, 2023, Lalor was appointed as an assistant coach for NJ/NY Gotham FC.

References

External links
 

Living people
1972 births
United States women's international soccer players
Women's association football midfielders
Santa Clara Broncos women's soccer players
1995 FIFA Women's World Cup players
Hammarby Fotboll (women) players
Damallsvenskan players
Women's United Soccer Association players
San Diego Spirit players
New York Power players
Shiroki FC Serena players
Expatriate women's footballers in Japan
Expatriate women's footballers in Sweden
Nadeshiko League players
American expatriate women's soccer players
American expatriate sportspeople in Sweden
American expatriate sportspeople in Japan
American soccer coaches
American women's soccer players
Female association football managers
NJ/NY Gotham FC non-playing staff